City Church may be:

 City Church of Bremgarten, Switzerland
 City Church, Oxford, England
 Christian City Church, Oxford Falls, Sydney, Australia
 Donau City Church, Vienna, Austria
 Lutheran City Church, Vienna, Austria

See also 
 New York City Church Extension and Missionary Society, USA